Jofre Mateu González (born 24 January 1980), known simply as Jofre, is a Spanish retired professional footballer who played as a left midfielder.

He amassed Segunda División totals of 332 games and 28 goals over 11 seasons, in representation of six clubs. In La Liga, he appeared for Barcelona, Levante, Espanyol and Murcia.

Before retiring, Jofre spent three years in the Indian Super League.

Club career
Born in Alpicat, Lleida, Catalonia, Jofre was a product of FC Barcelona's prolific youth system. He made his first-team debut on 15 May 1998 (the last round of the season), scoring as a substitute in a 1–4 home loss against UD Salamanca; playing mainly with the B team, he only made one more appearance with the main squad, four years later.

In 2002, Jofre joined Segunda División side Levante UD, being instrumental in their 2004 promotion to La Liga. He appeared in 27 league games the following campaign, which ended in relegation.

Jofre returned to his native region and the top flight with RCD Espanyol, but played almost no part in a team that narrowly avoided relegation. He then moved to Real Murcia, contributing three league goals to another top-tier promotion.

In August 2008, Jofre signed with Rayo Vallecano, recently promoted to division two. He started during most of his spell in Madrid, and continued to compete in that league the following years, being first choice with Real Valladolid and Girona FC.

On 26 August 2014, aged 34, Jofre moved abroad for the first time in his career, being drafted by ATK in the inaugural season of the Indian Super League. He scored his first goal for his new club on 19 October, converting a penalty kick in a 1–1 draw against Delhi Dynamos FC after Fikru Teferra had been fouled inside the box.

Jofre joined another team in the Indian top division for the 2015 campaign, FC Goa.

Club statistics

Honours
Barcelona
La Liga: 1997–98

Espanyol
Copa del Rey: 2005–06

ATK
Indian Super League: 2014

References

External links

1980 births
Living people
People from Segrià
Sportspeople from the Province of Lleida
Spanish footballers
Footballers from Catalonia
Association football midfielders
La Liga players
Segunda División players
Segunda División B players
Tercera División players
FC Barcelona C players
FC Barcelona Atlètic players
FC Barcelona players
RCD Mallorca B players
Levante UD footballers
RCD Espanyol footballers
Real Murcia players
Rayo Vallecano players
Real Valladolid players
Girona FC players
Indian Super League players
ATK (football club) players
FC Goa players
Spain youth international footballers
Catalonia international footballers
Spanish expatriate footballers
Expatriate footballers in India
Spanish expatriate sportspeople in India